Juan Ignacio Chela was the defending champion but decided not to participate.
Marcos Daniel won in the final 6–3, 7–5, against Juan Sebastián Cabal.

Seeds

Draw

Finals

Top half

Bottom half

References
 Main Draw
 Qualifying Draw

Seguros Bolivar Open Medellin - Singles
2010 Singles